Ahsan Khan may refer to:

 Ahsan Khan (born 1981), Pakistani film and television actor who work here and there as well studied at comsats university 
Ahsan Khan Chowdhury (born September 6, 1970, in Dhaka, Bangladesh) is Chairman & CEO of PRAN-RFL Group.
 Ahsan Azhar Hayat Khan (born 1952), Pakistani army officer and ambassador 
 Ahsan Mohomed Khan (born 1916), Indian field hockey player